Randolph Starks, Jr. (born December 14, 1983) is a former American football defensive end who played twelve seasons in the  National Football League (NFL). He was drafted by the Tennessee Titans in the third round of the 2004 NFL Draft. He played college football at Maryland. He also played for the Miami Dolphins and Cleveland Browns.

Early years
An army brat, Starks spent the first five years of his life in Germany because his father, Randolph, Sr., was stationed there with the United States Army. He was eventually re-deployed to Fort Belvoir in Virginia.

Starks attended Westlake High School in Waldorf, Maryland, where he was a letterman in football, basketball and track. In football, he was an honorable mention all-state selection as a junior defensive tackle after recording 67 tackles, six sacks and two forced fumbles. He was a SuperPrep All-American as a senior with 77 tackles, seven sacks and two forced fumbles. He also played offensive tackle during his final two seasons at Westlake. Starks finished his prep career with 194 tackles while ranking third in school history in sacks.

Starks also earned four letters competing in basketball and track. In basketball, he was the leading scorer and rebounder in the Southern Maryland Athletic Conference (SMAC) as a junior. As a senior, he led his team to a 23-3 record and was named Southern Maryland's Basketball Player of the Year by The Washington Post. He finished his career with 1,011 points scored and 682 rebounds. In track & field, Starks was a two-time state qualifier in both the shot put and discus throw. At the 2001 Maryland State Meet, he earned a second-place finish in the discus, with a throw of 43.28 meters (141 ft, 9 in), while also placing third in the shot put, with a throw of 15.80 meters (51 ft, 8 in). In addition, he reportedly bench-pressed 320 pounds and had a 32-inch vertical leap.

College career
Following high school, Starks chose to attend the University of Maryland, College Park over schools such as Penn State and Virginia Tech. He wore No. 57 for the Maryland Terrapins football team.

Starks appeared in 11 games as a true freshman in 2001, including the Orange Bowl against Florida. During the season, he recorded 35 tackles (24 solo), seven tackles for a loss and 3.5 sacks. His performance earned him a fourth-team All-American selection by Sporting News. Starks was nominated for ACC Rookie of the Week honors following a game against Georgia Tech in which he recorded eight tackles, 1.5 sacks and forced a fumble in overtime.

As a sophomore in 2002, Starks appeared in all 14 games for the Terrapins including the Peach Bowl against Tennessee. He earned second-team All-ACC honors after recording 93 tackles, 6.5 sacks, 12.5 tackles for a loss, a forced fumble, a fumble recovery and six passes defensed. His tackle total ranked third on the team, his sack total second on the team while his 17 quarterback hurries led the team.

Prior to his junior season, Starks was named the preseason ACC Defensive Player of the Year by ESPN.com and was on the watchlist for the Lombardi Award and Outland Trophy. He appeared in 13 games for the Terrapins in 2003 on his way to first-team All-ACC honors.  He finished the season with 74 tackles (39 solo), 15.5 tackles for a loss, 7.5 sacks, a forced fumble and three passes defensed. His tackles for a loss total led the team while ranking fourth in the conference. Starks was named ACC Defensive Lineman of the Week following a game against Virginia in which he had eight tackles (five solo), three tackles for a loss and a sack of quarterback Matt Schaub.

Starks decided to forgo his senior season at Maryland and instead declare for the 2004 NFL Draft at the age of 20. A two-time All-ACC selection, he finished his college career with 38 games played, 201 tackles (111 solo), 34 tackles for a loss, 17.5 sacks, three forced fumbles, a fumble recovery, and nine passes defensed.

College statistics

Key: GP – games played; Total – total tackles; Solo – solo tackles; Ast – assisted tackles; TFL – tackles for loss; Sck – quarterback sacks; FF – forced fumbles; FR – fumble recoveries; INT – interceptions; PD – passes defensed; TD – touchdowns

Professional career

Pre-draft
Prior to the 2004 NFL Draft, Starks attended the NFL Scouting Combine and met with the Atlanta Falcons, Carolina Panthers, Miami Dolphins, New England Patriots, Oakland Raiders and San Francisco 49ers. In April, he visited with the Kansas City Chiefs.

Tennessee Titans
Starks was drafted by the Tennessee Titans in the third round (71st overall) of the 2004 NFL Draft. The pick used to draft him was acquired from the Houston Texans in a draft day trade. He was initially unable to attend offseason workouts due to a league rule preventing rookies from participating in team activities before their school year has been completed. Starks agreed to terms on a contract with the Titans on July 28. He wore No. 90 for the team.

As a rookie in 2004, Starks appeared in all but two games for the Titans and started eight games. He made his NFL debut on September 11 against the Miami Dolphins, sacking quarterback A. J. Feeley. During the season, he also sacked Carson Palmer (Bengals), Craig Krenzel (Bears) and David Carr (Texans). His 4.5 sacks on the year led all rookie defensive tackles, including six players – Tommie Harris, Vince Wilfork, Marcus Tubbs, Darnell Dockett, Junior Siavii, Tank Johnson – drafted before him. Additionally, he recorded 53 tackles, two forced fumbles, a fumble recovery, a pass defensed and a blocked field goal on the season. He forced fumbles against Krenzel and Peyton Manning (Colts) while blocking a Kris Brown kick against the Houston Texans.

With the Titans reportedly impressed with Starks' rookie campaign, he worked with the first-team defense during the 2005 offseason. He wound up started all 16 regular season games for the Titans that season, recording 78 tackles and three sacks. His sacks came against Anthony Wright (Ravens), Marc Bulger (Rams) and Gus Frerotte (Dolphins).

In 2006, Starks appeared in all 16 games for the second straight season and started eight of them. He finished the year with 56 tackles, three sacks and a fumble recovery. In the season opener against the New York Jets, he recovered a Chad Pennington fumble that led to a Titans touchdown on the next play. Against the Philadelphia Eagles on November 19, Starks returned a Jeff Garcia fumble 26 yards before lateraling it to linebacker Keith Bulluck, who took it 16 more yards for a score. His sacks that season came against David Carr (Texans) and David Garrard (Jaguars).

A restricted free agent in the 2007 offseason, Starks was tendered a contract by the Titans on March 1. He went on to appear in 14 games for the Titans that season but started a career-low four games. He recorded 39 tackles and fumble recovery on the year but failed to record a sack for the first time in his career. In a Monday Night Football contest against the New Orleans Saints, he recovered a Drew Brees fumble forced by Travis LaBoy. He became an unrestricted free agent following the season.

Miami Dolphins
On February 29, 2008, Starks signed with the Miami Dolphins. He signed a five-year, $21 million contract with $7 million guaranteed. In April, it was reported he would see playing time at both right defensive end and nose tackle. In 2012, Starks joined Cameron Wake as the first two players in Dolphins history to earn Pro Bowl honors at two different positions (NT, DE). On March 11, 2015, the Dolphins released Starks making him a free agent.

Cleveland Browns
On March 16, 2015, Starks signed with the Cleveland Browns. On February 18, 2016, Starks was released. Starks's only season with the Browns ended with 29 tackles, one sack, and one fumble recovered.

Professional statistics

Key: GP – games played; GS – games started; Total – total tackles; Solo – solo tackles; Ast – assisted tackles; Sck – quarterback sacks; FF – forced fumbles; FR – fumble recoveries; INT – interceptions; PD – passes defensed; TD – touchdowns

After football
Starks is pursuing a master's degree from Georgetown University which he expects to finish up in the fall of 2022.

Starks coached football at Virginia's Manassas Park High School in 2020, as offensive and defensive line coach, and in 2021 as head coach. He resigned in August 2022 ahead of the school cancelling its upcoming season. He is currently working at LaGrange College as the defensive line coach.

Legal issues
On May 24, 2009, Starks was arrested on Ocean Drive in South Beach, Miami after his vehicle made contact with a traffic officer during the busy Memorial Day Weekend festivities. All charges were dropped in July 2009.

In November 2016, Starks prevailed in a civil suit against the arresting officer after a jury determined that he was not liable for the events occurring during the traffic stop on May 24, 2009.

References

External links

Maryland Terrapins bio
Miami Dolphins bio
Cleveland Browns bio

1983 births
Living people
Sportspeople from Petersburg, Virginia
People from Waldorf, Maryland
African-American players of American football
American football defensive tackles
American football defensive ends
Maryland Terrapins football players
Tennessee Titans players
Miami Dolphins players
Cleveland Browns players
American Conference Pro Bowl players
21st-century African-American sportspeople
20th-century African-American people